Cypress Point Club is a private golf club located in Pebble Beach, California, at the northern end of the Central Coast. Its single 18-hole course has been named as one of the finest in golf, best known for a series of dramatic holes along the Pacific Ocean.

History 
The course was designed in 1928 by golf course designer Alister MacKenzie, collaborating with fellow golf course architect Robert Hunter. It opened on August 11 that year, following the efforts of Byington Ford, Roger D. Lapham, and Marion Hollins.

Golf Course 
Set in coastal dunes, the course's front nine enter the Del Monte forest, reemerging on the rocky coastline for the back nine. The signature hole is #16, which requires a  tee shot over the Pacific to a mid-sized green guarded by strategically placed bunkers.

Cypress Point Club was ranked #2 on Golf Magazine's 2011 List of the Top 100 Golf Courses in the World and #5 on Golf Digest's 2011–12 list of America's 100 Greatest Golf Courses.

The golf course is considered one of the most exclusive in the world. Non-members require the invitation of a member to play.

PGA Tour
From 1947 through 1990 Cypress Point was on the PGA Tour as part of the multi-course AT&T Pebble Beach Pro-Am, founded by entertainer Bing Crosby. It was dropped from the rotation because it had no black members and refused to admit one to comply with the tour's anti-discrimination guidelines. Since then, Condoleezza Rice was admitted as a member of the club.

While no longer part of the AT&T Pebble Beach Pro-Am, many of the players continue to visit the course in the week leading up the tournament.

Scorecard

References

External links
Cypress Point Course Information - with photos and interactive map

1928 establishments in California
Golf clubs and courses designed by Alister MacKenzie
Golf clubs and courses in California
Pebble Beach, California
Sports venues completed in 1928
Sports venues in Monterey County, California
Walker Cup venues